Mansion Musik is the fifth studio album by American rapper and singer Trippie Redd. It was released through 10K Projects and 1400 Entertainment on January 20, 2023. The album features guest appearances from Chief Keef, Future, Lil Baby, the late Juice Wrld, Travis Scott, Lil Durk, Nardo Wick, Big30, Lucki, Rich the Kid, Summrs, Fijimacintosh, Rylo Rodriguez, Ski Mask the Slump God, G Herbo, Rob49, DaBaby, Lil B, and Kodak Black. It was executive produced by Chief Keef and serves as the follow-up to Redd's previous album, Trip at Knight (2021).

Commercial performance
The album debuted on the Billboard 200 at #3 selling 56,000 album-equivalent units.

Release and promotion
In early 2023, Redd announced the title of the album. On January 9, 2023, he revealed that Travis Scott would be featured on a song from it by posting a picture of a conversation with him that saw the two discussing details about their collaboration for the album. Exactly one week later, Redd teased snippets of the respective collaborations with both Travis Scott and Future. That same day, he revealed the tracklist of the album, in which he stated that he would announce its release date if his promotional post for it received 80,000 comments that said "#MM", its initials. On January 17, 2023, sources close to Redd revealed to news website TMZ that the album was set to be released three days later and Redd would let his fans know more details later that day.

Critical reception

Mansion Musik received generally mixed reviews from critics. At Metacritic, which assigns a normalized rating out of 100 to reviews from mainstream publications, the album received an average score of 58, based on 5 reviews. Andre Gee of Rolling Stone wrote, "Whether Trippie is exploring murky, minimalist beats, tapping into his inner Tom DeLonge, or fighting with the rambunctious synth-driven production that Mansion Musik is stocked with, one thing is for certain: His voice is going to soar. Trippie's vocal skills are his defining attribute, and they're exemplified to great effect on Mansion Musik." Although his review was mostly positive, Gee criticized the content of the tracks, writing, "As compelling as Trippie's vocals and production are, each track leaves the listener feeling like he could be doing more as a songwriter. There's a misconception that melody-driven artists don't prioritize bars, but that's not necessarily true." Scott Glaysher of HipHopDX wrote favorably of the songs but regarded the album as too long, writing, "The songs themselves are actually quite good in their own unique way but it's difficult for anyone to jump around a 25-track album and get the most out of it."

Steve 'Flash' Juon of RapReviews commented, "For an album with so many featured guest stars, it still feels incredibly lonely and isolated in Trippie Redd's world, and that's just depressing when I'm paying close attention. If you can enjoy the music in a vacuum without his lyrics affecting you like they do me, more power to you. Not all negative rap bothers me, but Trippie Redd's dour outlook isn't for me, no matter how much that winds up making me like Grandpa Simpson." Paul Attard of Slant Magazine gave a negative review, writing that the album is "repetitive, shoddily produced, and lacks any real structure" and "consistent in that regard." He added, "There's something to be said for the pure single-mindedness of an album such as this, which vehemently strikes the same numbing note over and over again. Yet, considering how hard it tries to conjure an atmosphere of wild danger, what's perhaps most disappointing about Mansion Musik is how predictable of an experience it ultimately amounts to."

Track listing

Personnel

 Trippie Redd – vocals
 Igor Mamet – mastering, mixing, engineering
 Matt Spats – guitar (track 1)
 Chief Keef – vocals (2, 21)
 Future – vocals (3, 4)
 Lil Baby – vocals (4, 7)
 Juice Wrld – vocals (5)
 Travis Scott – vocals (9)
 Lil Durk – vocals (10)
 Nardo Wick – vocals (11)
 Big30 – vocals (13)
 Lucki – vocals (14)
 Rich the Kid – vocals (15)
 Summrs – vocals (16)
 Fijimacintosh – vocals (17)
 Rylo Rodriguez – vocals (18)
 Ski Mask the Slump God – vocals (19)
 G Herbo – vocals (20)
 Rob49 – vocals (22)
 DaBaby – vocals (23)
 Lil B – vocals (24)
 Kodak Black – vocals (25)

Charts

References

2023 albums
Trippie Redd albums
Rap rock albums by American artists
Albums produced by Cubeatz
Albums produced by Pi'erre Bourne